William Pollitt (22 June 1918 – 19 August 1978) was a New Zealand cricketer. He played in four first-class matches for Canterbury from 1946 to 1948.

See also
 List of Canterbury representative cricketers

References

External links
 

1918 births
1978 deaths
New Zealand cricketers
Canterbury cricketers
Place of birth missing